Tring may refer to:

 Tring in Hertfordshire, UK
 Tring Athletic F.C.
 Tring (hundred), a historical administrative division
 Tring language, one of the languages of Borneo